Charles Rogers Robinson (May 30, 1925 – February 3, 2007) was an American guard and linebacker who played for the Green Bay Packers in the National Football League and the Baltimore Colts in the American Football League.  Born in Lester Manor, Virginia, Robinson played collegiate ball for the University of Kansas before playing professionally for 2 seasons.  He retired from professional football in 1954 and died in Towson, Maryland at the age of 81.

References

2007 deaths
1925 births
American football guards
American football linebackers
Morgan State Bears football players
Green Bay Packers players
Baltimore Colts players
Players of American football from Virginia